Whorlton is a hamlet and civil parish in the Hambleton District of North Yorkshire, England. It is very near Swainby and the A19, and 6 miles south west of Stokesley. Features include the remains of Whorlton Castle and the Church of the Holy Rood.

Whorlton Castle was built by Robert de Meynell as a typical 12th century motte and bailey Norman castle. A gatehouse was added in the 14th century. The only remains visible today are the grade I listed gatehouse and traces of the grade II* listed undercrofts (or cellars) of the main building. Due to vandalism access to the site is restricted.

References

External links

Villages in North Yorkshire
Civil parishes in North Yorkshire